Francis McCullagh (30 April 1874 – 25 November 1956) was an Irish journalist, war correspondent, and author.

Career overview
McCullagh was born in Bridge Street, Omagh, County Tyrone, in 1874, the son of James McCullagh, a publican originally from the Gortin area, and Bridget McCullagh.

He began his journalism career as a staff reporter at the Glasgow Observer (later Scottish Catholic Observer), and would continue writing for the newspaper through 1906–1937. From 1898, he was a correspondent for the New York Herald. In 1903, he was living in Japan, working for the English-language newspaper The Japan Times. Observing the growing tension between the Empire of Japan and the Russian Empire, he studied the Russian language. In 1904, he moved to Port Arthur, the major Russian military base in Manchuria, obtaining a post as a correspondent for the Novi Kraï (New Land) newspaper of Port Arthur. At the start of the Russo-Japanese War, he became a non-military observer embedded within the Imperial Russian Army.  In March 1905, he was evacuated as a prisoner of war, traveling from Dalny to Ujina on the Nippon Yusen liner Awa Maru. His experiences were published in 1906 as With the Cossacks: Being the Story of an Irishman Who Rode With the Cossacks Throughout the Russo-Japanese War.

He subsequently returned to Russia to cover the 1918-1922 Siberian Intervention during the Russian Civil War. At one point, the Bolshevik Red Army captured him. His book about the experience, A Prisoner of the Reds, was first published in 1921.

In 1927, Father Wilfrid Parsons arranged payment from the Knights of Columbus to "smuggle" McCullagh into Mexico to cover the Cristero War for an American audience.

In 1937, he covered the Spanish Civil War.

McCullagh died in White Plains, New York in 1956.

Notes

Works
 (1906). With the Cossacks; Being the Story of an Irishman who Rode with the Cossacks Throughout the Russo-Japanese War. London: Eveleigh Nash. OCLC 777525 [Reprinted by Naval and Military Press, 2009].
 (1910). The Fall of Abdul-Hamid, Methuen & Co., Ltd.
 (1912). Italy's War for a Desert, Being Some Experiences of a War-Correspondent with the Italians in Tripoli. London, Herbert and Daniel.
 (1921). A Prisoner of the Reds, the Story of a British Officer Captured in Siberia. London. John Murray.
 (1924). The Bolshevik Persecution of Christianity. New York, E. P. Dutton [1st Pub. London, John Murray, 1924].
 (1928).  Red Mexico; A Reign of Terror in America. New York, L. Carrier & Co.
 (1937). In Franco's Spain: Being the Experiences of an Irish War Correspondent During the Great Civil War. London, Burns, Oates & Washbourne, Ltd.

Selected articles

 "A Trappist Monastery in Japan," The Catholic World, Vol. LXXIX, April/September, 1904.
 "Civil War Inevitable in the Empire of the Czar," The New York Times, 8 July 1906.
 "When Turkey's Sultan Faced his Masters," The New York Times, 10 January 1909.
 "On the March with the Macedonians," The New York Times, 9 May 1909.
 "How the Young Turks Fought and Captured Constantinople," The New York Times, 16 May 1909.
 "How the Attack was Delayed," The New York Times, 16 May 1909.
 "The Fall of Constantinople," The New York Times, 23 May 1909.
 "The Taking of Constantinople," The New York Times, 23 May 1909.
 "How Abdul Hamid Was Sent Into His Exile," The New York Times, 30 May 1909.
 "Napoleonic Rapidity," The New York Times, 30 May 1909.
 "What was Found in the Lair of Abdul Hamid," The New York Times, 6 June 1909.
 "The April Mutiny in Stamboul," The Dublin Review, Vol. CXLIV, July/October, 1909.
 "Some Causes of the Portuguese Revolution," The Nineteenth Century and After, Vol. LXVIII, No. 405, 1910.
 "Modernism in Islam," The Dublin Review, Vol. CXLVI, January/April, 1910.
 "The Portuguese Revolution," The Dublin Review, Vol. CXLVIII, January/April, 1911.
 "Portuguese Republicans 'Fiddling While Rome Burns'," The New York Times, 21 May 1911.
 "Separation of Church and State in Portugal," The Catholic World, Vol. XCIII, April/September, 1911.

 "'Freedom' in Portugal," The Living Age, Vol. CCLXVIII, 1911.
 "The Portuguese Separation Law," The Dublin Review, Vol. CXLIX, July/October 1911.
 "How the Carbonaria Saved the Portuguese Republic", The Contemporary Review, No. 561, September 1912.
 "The Belgian Strike," The Dublin Review, Vol. CLIII, July/October 1913.
 "Portugal: The Nightmare Republic," The Nineteenth Century and After, January 1914. 
 "The Portuguese Republic and the Press," The Dublin Review, Vol. CLIV, January/April, 1914.
 "The Baltic States from an Irish Point of View. I: The Baltic Barons," Studies: An Irish Quarterly Review, Vol. 11, No. 41, Mar., 1922.
 "The United States and Mexico," The Living Age, 15 November 1927.
 "Who Is Calles?," Studies: An Irish Quarterly Review, Vol. 17, No. 65, Mar., 1928.
 "Notes on Linguistic Studies in Paris," Studies: An Irish Quarterly Review, Vol. 18, No. 69, Mar., 1929.
 "Mexico and the Press," Studies: An Irish Quarterly Review, Vol. 18, No. 70, Jun., 1929.
 "A Pioneer of Newspaper Combines," Studies: An Irish Quarterly Review, Vol. 19, No. 73, Mar., 1930.
 "Peter the Great and Lenin," Studies: An Irish Quarterly Review, Vol. 19, No. 76, Dec., 1930.
 "The General Who Shall Take Madrid," Catholic Herald, 5 March 1937.
 "America is Becoming More and More Anti-Democratic," Catholic Herald, 6 December 1940.

Further reading
 Horgan, John (2009). "Journalism, Catholicism and Anti-Communism in an Era of Revolution: Francis McCullagh, War Correspondent, 1874-1956," Studies: An Irish Quarterly Review, Vol. 98, No. 390, pp. 169–184.
 Horgan, John (2009). "The Great War Correspondent: Francis McCullagh, 1874-1956," Irish Historical Studies, XXXVI (44), pp. 542–563.
 McNamara, Patrick J. (2006). "Russia, Rome, and Recognition: American Catholics and Anticommunism in the 1920s," U.S. Catholic Historian, Vol. 24, No. 2, pp. 71–88.

External links
 
 Obituary

1874 births
1956 deaths
Irish journalists
Irish war correspondents
People from Omagh
War correspondents of the Russo-Japanese War
Royal Irish Fusiliers officers